The 2016 Hall of Fame Tennis Championships was a men's tennis tournament played on outdoor grass courts. It was the 41st edition of the Hall of Fame Tennis Championships, and part of the ATP World Tour 250 series of the 2016 ATP World Tour. It took place at the International Tennis Hall of Fame in Newport, Rhode Island, United States, from July 11 through July 17, 2016.

Singles main draw entrants

Seeds 

 1 Rankings are as of June 27, 2016

Other entrants 
The following players received wildcards into the singles main draw:
  James Duckworth 
  Stefan Kozlov
  Mackenzie McDonald

The following players received entry from the qualifying draw:
  Brian Baker
  Frank Dancevic 
  Alex Kuznetsov 
  Michał Przysiężny

The following player received entry as a lucky loser:
  Amir Weintraub

Withdrawals 
Before the tournament
  Taylor Fritz →replaced by  Yūichi Sugita 
  Tatsuma Ito →replaced by  Lukáš Lacko
  Konstantin Kravchuk →replaced by  Marco Chiudinelli
  John Millman →replaced by  Austin Krajicek
  Vasek Pospisil →replaced by  Amir Weintraub
  Sam Querrey →replaced by  Dennis Novikov
  Sergiy Stakhovsky →replaced by  Ryan Harrison

Doubles main draw entrants

Seeds 

 Rankings are as of June 27, 2016

Other entrants 
The following pairs received wildcards into the doubles main draw:
  Austin Krajicek /  Gerardo López Villaseñor
  Alex Lawson /  Mackenzie McDonald

Champions

Singles 

  Ivo Karlović def.  Gilles Müller, 6–7(2–7), 7–6(7–5), 7–6(14–12)

Doubles 

  Sam Groth /  Chris Guccione def.  Jonathan Marray /  Adil Shamasdin, 6–4, 6–3

References

External links